James Seth Littrell (born July 24, 1978) is an American football coach and former player. He was the head coach of the North Texas Mean Green football team from 2016–2022.

Early life
Littrell was born in Muskogee, Oklahoma, and attended Muskogee High School. He played fullback and linebacker where he rushed for 1,385 yards and 29 touchdowns his senior year. He was named first team all state as a linebacker. He finished his prep career with a total of 3,603 rushing yards and 53 TDs. He was recruited by Oklahoma, Oklahoma State, Tulsa, Arkansas, Kansas State and Texas. Littrell also wrestled and won two 5A state championship at 189 lbs.

Littrell attended the University of Oklahoma, where he played four years and was a team captain on the Oklahoma Sooners football team that won the 2000 national championship. He graduated in 2001 with a degree in communications. His father, Jimmy, also played fullback at OU and won two national championships in 1974 and 1975.

Coaching career
Litrell started his coaching as a graduate assistant for the Kansas Jayhawks football team for two seasons from 2002 to 2004.

Under Mike Leach, he was running backs coach at Texas Tech from 2005 to 2008. From 2009 to 2011, Littrell coached the offense at Arizona. Then from 2012 to 2013, Littrell was offensive coordinator and tight ends coach at Indiana from 2012 to 2013. From 2014 to 2015, Littrell was assistant head coach for offense and tight ends coach at North Carolina under Larry Fedora. In Littrell's last season at North Carolina, the team finished 11–3 and first place in the ACC Coastal Division.

North Texas
On December 5, 2015, Littrell was named the head coach at North Texas. UNT hired Littrell after the Mean Green finished 1-11 in 2015. School officials moved quickly to sign Littrell to an extension following the season through 2021. After his first season which saw the team finish in a bowl game and with a 5–8 record, his second season his team broke through. With great play from future NFL back Jeffrey Wilson, senior Kishawn McClain, and the future program passing leader sophomore Mason Fine, the team finished the season with a 9–5 record. This was the first 9-win season in almost 40 years for UNT and led to another contract extension. The following season Littrell led the Mean Green to a 4–0 start with wins that included a 46–23 win over rival SMU, and a surprising 44–17 win over SEC Arkansas. The team finished again with 9 wins and a third consecutive bowl appearance. Littrell is 0–5 in bowl games with the most recent game coming on December 23rd, 2021 where UNT lost to Miami (OH) 27-14 in the Frisco Football Classic.
 
North Texas fired Littrell on December 4, 2022, following a 7–6 season in which North Texas qualified for the Frisco Bowl but lost the conference championship game to UTSA. Defensive coordinator Phil Bennett took over as interim head coach for the bowl game.

Head coaching record

References

External links
 North Texas profile

Living people
1978 births
American football quarterbacks
Arizona Wildcats football coaches
Indiana Hoosiers football coaches
Kansas Jayhawks football coaches
North Carolina Tar Heels football coaches
North Texas Mean Green football coaches
Oklahoma Sooners football players
Texas Tech Red Raiders football coaches
Sportspeople from Muskogee, Oklahoma
Coaches of American football from Oklahoma
Players of American football from Oklahoma